Meihriban Shukurova (born 8 June 1984) is an Azerbaijani chess player. She received the FIDE title of Woman International Master (WIM) in 2000.

Biography
From the end 1990s to the early 2000s, Meihriban Shukurova was one of the leading female chess players in Azerbaijan.

Shukurova played for Azerbaijan in the Women's Chess Olympiads:
 In 1998, at third board in the 33rd Chess Olympiad (women) in Elista (+8, =4, -1),
 In 2000, at third board in the 34th Chess Olympiad (women) in Istanbul (+5, =3, -4),
 In 2002, at second board in the 35th Chess Olympiad (women) in Bled (+5, =4, -4),
 In 2004, at third board in the 36th Chess Olympiad (women) in Calvià (+7, =4, -3).

She played for Azerbaijan in the European Women's Team Chess Championshipss:
 In 1999, at second board in the 3rd European Team Chess Championship (women) in Batumi (+5, =2, -2) and won team bronze medal and two individual gold medals,
 In 2001, at second board in the 4th European Team Chess Championship (women) in León (+3, =4, -2).

Since 2008 she rarely participated in chess tournaments.

References

External links
 
 
 

1984 births
Living people
Azerbaijani female chess players
Chess Woman International Masters
Chess Olympiad competitors